

The Darebin Creek Trail is a shared use path for cyclists and pedestrians which follows Darebin Creek in the inner and outer northern suburbs of Melbourne, Victoria, Australia.

The path consists of an 8 km section north of the Western Ring Road and a 17 km section south of the Western Ring Road. The two sections are separated by a 0.85 km section of path along the Western Ring Road Trail.

Bicycle Victoria announced on 7 August 2009 on its web site that the Victorian Civil and Administrative Tribunal (VCAT) had approved the issuing of permits for the Lower Darebin Trail and associated bridge over the Yarra. Work on the Lower Darebin trail started late in 2010, and is expected to be completed in 2015.

Following the path
The northern section starts on the very edge of Melbourne surburbia next to open countryside. Travelling south through remnant vegetation and 2.2 km later, one arrives at Hendersons Rd. Epping station is 500m to the west along Hendersons Rd and the station is soon followed by Epping Plaza.

The path arrives at Childs Road, 1.3 km further along, having crossed a small footbridge earlier. Cross the Childs Road bridge to the east. The Hendersons Road Drain Trail is on the left (north) and the Darebin Creek Trail continues on the right (south), on the other side of Childs Road.

900m later the path forks to the left and right. Take the path towards the footbridge but do not cross it - continue straight ahead. After 2 km, McKimmies Road is approached. The path does not proceed under the road. Cross McKimmies Road and continue on for 1.6 km through Thomastown East Reserve. A small wetland nearby harbours the Growling Grass Frog.

The path intersects with the Western Ring Road Trail. Travel 850m east along the Western Ring Road Trail to where the Darebin Creek Trail continues to the south on its west bank, crossing under the Western Ring Road. The creek name is signed for road users only but is clearly visible for trail users.

Leaving the Western Ring Road Trail the southern section starts by descending to the creek and tracking along the west bank of the creek. After crossing McCleans Road, the path splits in two, as it enters a Norris Bank Reserve. Either path can be taken as they rejoin at the far end of the reserve at Settlement Road.

On the south side of Settlement Road the path continues on the west side of the creek for 2.6 km until it reaches the eastern end of Rathcown Rd, by a paddock full of shaggy sheep where there is a new bridge crossing. (An on-road shortcut is to continue west along Rathcown Rd for 600 metres to a path on the left that re-connects to the Darebin Creek trail). The trail crosses to the eastern side where the path continues to a T-intersection where the path to the right follows the creek, left connects to Bundoora Park via Waters Way. At Chenies Street, Dunne Street and Plenty Rd, change sides of the creek. An unsigned path looms up on the left, that leads to the Bundoora campus of La Trobe University and is surveyed by a lone park bench.

800m later cross the footbridge to the east bank of the creek. The trail continues south past another footbridge on the right (west) that leads to Northland Shopping Centre. Do not cross the bridge, just continue onwards.

One km later the bitumen trail meets a crossing with a concrete trail. Turn right (west) onto the concrete trail and head downhill. Going straight ahead on the bitumen trail leads to the Austin Hospital helipad (Heidelberg Repatriation Hospital) near Bell Street.

Three km later the trail meets the north end of Ford Grove. Continue to the south end of Ford Grove where the trail continues. After another 500m the trail forks at a wooden boardwalk section: To the left (east) it crosses a footbridge. Take the right path and continue straight ahead towards Smith Street. The trail passes under the large and high steel bridge that carries the Hurstbridge railway line, and then under the bluestone and concrete Darebin Creek Bridge (Heidelberg Road), before finishing at Sparks Reserve.

The pedestrian and cycling bridge spanning the Yarra River, connecting the Darebin Creek Trail to the Main Yarra Trail, was opened on the 25th of March 2018. Community advocacy groups worked over a twenty-year period to achieve this impressive outcome.

Epping to South Morang rail extension
The extension of the rail line from Epping to South Morang  intersects the Darebin Creek Trail in the vicinity of Sunrise Crt and Maywood Drv, the Hendersons Road Drain Trail near Maywood Drv and the route to the City Of Whittlesea's Mill Park Leisure Centre in Morang Drv.

Connections
Dead end in the north at Porsche Crt. Intersects the Hendersons Road Drain Trail in Mill Park at Childs Rd and the Western Ring Road Trail in Bundoora.

Connects to the Main Yarra Trail in the south

References

Bike rides around Melbourne 3rd edition, 2009, Julia Blunden, Open Spaces Publishing, 
 Bike Paths Victoria sixth edition, 2004. Edited and published by Sabey & Associates Pty Ltd. pp114.

External links
Darebin Council Federal funding award for Darebin Creek Trail
Bicycle Victoria - Tribunal rules for Darebin Bridge go-ahead
Preston Leader - Cyclists on track after 20 years
Progress Leader - Split in path's way
Darebin trail extension , Darebin BUG
Boroondara council - Willsmere Park plan
Darebin bridge, Boroondara BUG
Boroondara BUG - Belford Rd hill & the proposed Eastern Veloway
Friends of Darebin Creek

Bike paths in Melbourne
Proposed bridges in Australia